Peters Township School District is a large, suburban, public school district located in Peters Township, Washington County, Pennsylvania and encompasses an area of . Peters Township School District had a population of 17,566, according to the 2000 federal census. By 2010, the district's population increased to 21,219 people. The educational attainment levels for the School District population (25 years old and over) were 95.9% high school graduates and 56.1% college graduates. The district is one of the 500 public school districts of Pennsylvania.

According to the Pennsylvania Budget and Policy Center, 3.2% of the district's pupils lived at 185% or below the Federal Poverty Level  as shown by their eligibility for the federal free or reduced price school meal programs in 2012. In 2009, the per capita income was $36,159, while the median family income was $86,661. In the Commonwealth, the median family income was $49,501 and the United States median family income was $49,445, in 2010. In Washington County, the median household income was $53,693. By 2013, the median household income in the United States rose to $52,100. In 2014, the median household income in the USA was $53,700.

Peters Township School District operates five schools: 
 Bower Hill Elementary School Kindergarten through Grade 3
 Pleasant Valley Elementary School Kindergarten through Grade 3
 McMurray Elementary School Grades 4 – 5
 Peters Township Middle School Grades 6 - 8
 Peters Township High School Grades 9 - 12

High school students may choose to attend the Western Area Career Technology Center (WACTC) for training in the construction and mechanical trades. The Intermediate Unit IU1 provides the district with a wide variety of services like specialized education for disabled students and hearing, background checks for employees, state mandated recognizing and reporting child abuse training, speech and visual disability services and criminal background screenings and professional development for staff and faculty.

The Peters Township School District borders 4 other school districts - Upper St. Clair S.D. and Bethel Park S.D. (both in Allegheny County) to the north, Canon-McMillan S.D. to the south and west, and Ringgold S.D. to the south and east.

Extracurriculars
The district offers a wide variety of clubs, activities and over 16 sports.

Athletics 
All boys athletic teams have the "Indians" nickname, while most girls teams go by the nickname "Lady Indians". The Indians are members of both the Western Pennsylvania Interscholastic Athletic League (WPIAL) and of the Pennsylvania Interscholastic Athletic Association (PIAA).

High school 
The school district funds 13 boys and 13 girls varsity athletic teams at the high school, most of which, due to the school's high enrollment, compete at the highest classification level. These include:

Middle school 
The school district funds 6 boys and 7 girls athletic teams. These include:

References

External links
 

School districts in Washington County, Pennsylvania
Education in Pittsburgh area